The 2021 Southeastern Conference football season was the 89th season of Southeastern Conference (SEC) football, taking place during the 2021 NCAA Division I FBS football season. The season began on September 2, 2021, and ended with the 2021 SEC Championship Game on December 4, 2021. The SEC is a Power Five conference under the College Football Playoff. The season schedule was released on January 27, 2021.

Previous season
Due to the COVID-19 pandemic, the 2020 college football season was delayed. On July 31, the Southeastern Conference announced that its teams would play a ten-game conference-only season beginning in late September.

Also because of the Covid-19 pandemic attendance at all college football games during the 2020 season was restricted because of COVID-19 social distancing considerations. Limited home attendance requirements and all road games were set with similar attendance caps.

Alabama defeated Florida 52–46 for the 2020 SEC Championship Game.

Nine SEC teams participated in bowl games. Mississippi State defeated Tulsa 28–26 in the Armed Forces Bowl. Auburn lost to Northwestern 19–35 in the Citrus Bowl. Kentucky defeated NC State 23–21 in the Gator Bowl. Ole Miss defeated Indiana 26–20 in the Outback Bowl. Florida lost to Oklahoma 20–55 in the Cotton Bowl. Georgia defeated Cincinnati 24–21 in the Peach Bowl. Texas A&M defeated North Carolina 41–27 in the Orange Bowl.

Alabama defeated Notre Dame 31–14 in the Rose Bowl semifinal game.

Alabama defeated Ohio State 52–24 to win the CFP National Championship game.

Preseason

Recruiting classes

SEC Media Days
The 2021 SEC Media days were held July 19–22, 2021 at the Hyatt Regency Birmingham – The Wynfrey Hotel in Hoover, Alabama. The Preseason Polls was released on July 23, 2021. Each team had their head coach available to talk to the media at the event. Coverage of the event was televised on SEC Network and ESPN.

Preseason media polls

Preseason awards

All−American Teams

Individual awards

Preseason All-SEC media

 

References:

Preseason All-SEC coaches

 

References:

Head coaches
Three coaches were fired after the 2020 season.

Auburn Head Coach Gus Malzahn was fired after eight seasons at the school on On December 13, 2020. Boise State Bryan Harsin was named head coach on December 22, 2020.

On November 15, 2020, South Carolina Head Coach Will Muschamp was fired.  Offensive coordinator Mike Bobo replaced him as interim head coach with three games left in the season. Oklahoma Assistant Head Coach Shane Beamer replaced him on December 6, 2020.

On January 18, 2021, Tennessee Coach Jeremy Pruitt was fired and replaced by former UCF Head Coach Josh Heupel on January 27, 2021.

Rankings

Regular season
The schedule was released on January 27, 2021. The season began on September 2, 2021, and will end with the SEC Championship Game on December 4, 2021.

Week One

Week Two

Week Three

Week Four

Week Five

Week Six

Week Seven

Week Eight

Week Nine

Week Ten

Week Eleven

Week Twelve

Week Thirteen

Championship Game

Postseason

Bowl games

For the 2020–2025 bowl cycle, The SEC will have annually eight appearances in the following bowls: Sugar Bowl and Peach Bowl (unless they are selected for playoffs filled by a Big 12 and at-large team if champion is in the playoffs), Citrus Bowl, Duke's Mayo Bowl, Gator Bowl, Liberty Bowl, Music City Bowl, Outback Bowl and Texas Bowl. The SEC teams will go to a New Year's Six bowl if a team finishes higher than the champions of Power Five conferences in the final College Football Playoff rankings. The SEC champion are also eligible for the College Football Playoff if they're among the top four teams in the final CFP ranking.

Rankings are from Final CFP rankings. All times Central Time Zone.

Head to head matchups

Updated with the results of all games through December 4, 2021.

SEC vs Power Five matchups
The following games include SEC teams competing against Power Five conferences teams from the (ACC, Big Ten, Big 12, BYU/Notre Dame and Pac-12). All rankings are from the AP Poll at the time of the game.

SEC vs Group of Five matchups
The following games include SEC teams competing against "Group of Five" teams from the American, C-USA, MAC, Mountain West and Sun Belt.

SEC vs FBS independents matchups
The following games include SEC teams competing against FBS Independents, which includes Army, Liberty, New Mexico State, UConn or UMass.

SEC vs FCS matchups
The Football Championship Subdivision comprises 13 conferences and two independent programs.

SEC Records against other conferences
2021–2022 records against non-conference foes:

Regular Season

Post Season

Awards and honors

SEC individual season awards
The following individuals received postseason honors as voted by the SEC Conference football coaches at the end of the season

All-conference teams

The following players earned First Team All-SEC honors. Any teams showing (_) following their name are indicating the number of All-SEC Conference Honors awarded to that university for 1st team and 2nd team respectively.

Offense

Defense

Special teams

Notes:
 RS = Return Specialist
 AP/ST = All-Purpose/Special Teams Player (not a kicker or returner)
 † Two-time first team selection;
 ‡ Three-time first team selection

Honorable mentions
Alabama: 
Arkansas: 
Auburn: 
Florida: 
Georgia: 
Kentucky:
LSU: 
Mississippi State: 
Missouri: 
Ole Miss: 
South Carolina: 
Tennessee:
Texas A&M: 
Vanderbilt:

Players of the week

Home game attendance

Game played at Arkansas' secondary home stadium War Memorial Stadium, capacity: 54,120.

NFL draft

Total picks by school

List of selections
The following list includes all SEC Players drafted in the 2022 NFL Draft

References